This article documents the history of Chelsea Football Club, an English association football team based in Fulham, West London. For a general overview of the club, see Chelsea F.C.

Former Arsenal and England centre-forward Ted Drake was appointed manager in 1952 and proceeded to modernise the club. He removed the club's Chelsea pensioner crest, improved the youth set-up and training regime, rebuilt the side with shrewd signings from the lower divisions and amateur leagues, and led Chelsea to their first major trophy success – the League championship – in 1954–55. The following season saw UEFA create the European Champions' Cup, but after objections from The Football League, Chelsea were persuaded to withdraw from the competition before it started. Chelsea failed to build on this success, and spent the remainder of the 1950s in mid-table. Drake was dismissed in 1961 and replaced by player-coach Tommy Docherty.

Docherty built a new team around the group of talented young players emerging from the club's youth set-up, and Chelsea challenged for honours throughout the 1960s, enduring several near-misses. They were on course for a treble of League, FA Cup and League Cup going into the final stages of the 1964–65 season, winning the League Cup but faltering late on in the other two. In three seasons the side were beaten in three major semi-finals and were FA Cup runners-up. Under Docherty's successor, Dave Sexton, Chelsea won the FA Cup in 1970, beating Leeds United 2–1 in a final replay. The following year, Chelsea took their first European honour, a UEFA Cup Winners' Cup triumph, with another replayed win, this time over Real Madrid in Athens.

Ted Drake: Modernisation and the Championship (1952–61)

In 1952, former Arsenal and England striker Ted Drake was appointed manager. One of the first "tracksuit managers" who used to shake each player by the hand and wish them "all the best" before each match, Drake proceeded to modernise the club, both on and off the field. One of his first actions was to remove the image of a Chelsea pensioner from the match programme and the club's old nickname was no more. From then on they were to be known as the Blues. This also led to the introduction of a new "lion rampant" crest.

He improved the training regime, introducing ballwork to training sessions, a practice rare in England at the time; the youth and scouting systems begun by his predecessor were extended and he abandoned the club's old recruiting policy of signing often unreliable stars, opting instead for lesser known but more reliable players from the lower divisions. He also urged the club's fans to be more partisan and to get behind the team. Drake's early years were unpromising, as Chelsea finished 19th and just a point away from relegation in his first season and 8th in his second.

In 1954–55, the club's jubilee year, everything clicked. The team found a consistency rate not previously there as Chelsea unexpectedly won the First Division title. It included goalkeeper Charlie 'Chic' Thomson, amateur players Derek Saunders and Jim Lewis, central midfielder Johnny "Jock" McNichol, wingers Eric "Rabbit" Parsons and Frank Blunstone, defender Peter Sillett and future England manager Ron Greenwood in central defence, as well old club stalwarts, right back Ken Armstrong, left-back Stan Willemse and veteran defender John Harris. Perhaps the only genuine star in the side was captain, top-scorer (with 21 league goals) and England international Roy Bentley.

Chelsea had begun the season much as they had finished the last, with four consecutive defeats, including a thrilling 5–6 loss to Manchester United, which left them 12th in November. From there the team went on a remarkable run, losing just 3 of the next 25 games and secured the title with a game to spare after a 3–0 win against Sheffield Wednesday on St George's Day. Key to the success were two league wins against principal rivals and eventual runners-up Wolverhampton Wanderers. The first was a dramatic 4–3 win at Molineux – a game in which Chelsea were trailing 2–3 going into stoppage time – and a 1–0 win at Stamford Bridge in April, secured with a Sillett penalty awarded after Wolves captain Billy Wright had punched a goal-bound shot over the bar.

Chelsea's points total of 52 for that season remains one of the lowest to have secured the English League title since the First World War. In the final game of the season, Chelsea, now champions, were given a guard of honour by Matt Busby's Manchester United Busby Babes. That same season saw the club complete a unique quadruple, with the reserve, 'A' and junior sides also winning their respective leagues.

Winning the Championship should have ensured that Chelsea became the first English participants in the inaugural European Champions' Cup competition to be staged the following season. Indeed, they were drawn to face Swedish champions Djurgårdens IF in the first round. Chelsea, however, were denied by the intervention of the Football League and the FA, many of whose leading members were opposed to the idea and felt that primacy should be given to domestic competitions, so the club were persuaded to withdraw. Chelsea did play an unofficial UK championship friendly against Scottish champions Aberdeen, which Aberdeen won. Chelsea presented a plate with the club crest to Aberdeen as a reward.

Chelsea were unable to build on their title success, and finished a disappointing 16th the following season. The team was aging and there followed a succession of uninspiring mid-table finishes; one bright spot in this period was the emergence of the prolific goalscorer Jimmy Greaves, who scored 122 league goals in four seasons. Along with Greaves, a series of other promising youngsters, informally known as Drake's Ducklings, emerged in the first team, though their inexperience ensured that performances remained erratic. One of the lowest points for the club in this period was being knocked out of the FA Cup in the 3rd round by Fourth Division side, Crewe Alexandra, in January 1961. After Greaves was sold to Milan, results slumped without his goal contributions. Drake was sacked in September after a 4–0 loss to Blackpool with Chelsea bottom of the league table. He was replaced by 33-year-old player-coach Tommy Docherty.

Emergence (1963–71)

Tommy Docherty

The swinging sixties ushered in an era that saw football and inimitable style merge in the heart of London; with the fashionable King's Road at the heart of the swagger. Superstars of the time, including Michael Caine, Steve McQueen, Raquel Welch, Terence Stamp and Richard Attenborough (former Life Vice President of the club) were regularly seen at Stamford Bridge as the team became one of the most glamorous and fashionable in the country. A '60s Chelsea side that oozed charisma and class established the club as a big name for the first time, but ultimately failed to match its swagger with on-field triumphs, and endured several near-misses.

Docherty imposed a regime of strict discipline, sold off many of the club's older players, and replaced them with the new generation of talented youngsters emerging from the youth system, supplemented by some shrewd transfers. By the time he took over in January 1962, the team were already all but doomed to relegation and he used the time to experiment and plan for the future. Chelsea were duly relegated and in Docherty's first full season as manager he led them back to promotion as Second Division runners-up, secured with a crucial and hard-fought 1–0 win at rivals Sunderland (and a goal scored via Tommy Harmer's groin) and a 7–0 final day win over Portsmouth.

Chelsea thus returned to the First Division with a new, youthful team which included the uncompromising Ron "Chopper" Harris (who would set a club record of 795 senior appearances), goalkeeper Peter Bonetti, prolific goalscoring winger Bobby Tambling (whose 202 goals remained a club record until 2013), midfielder John Hollins, full-back Ken Shellito, striker Barry Bridges, winger Bert Murray and captain and playmaker Terry Venables, all products of the youth system. To these, Docherty added striker George Graham, left-back Eddie McCreadie and elegant defender Marvin Hinton for minimal fees to complete the Diamonds line-up – Docherty had referred to the team as his "little diamonds" during a TV documentary and the name stuck.

Chelsea finished a credible fifth in their first season back in the top-flight, and in the next were on course for a domestic "treble" of league, FA Cup and League Cup, playing a brand of football based on high energy and quick passing and utilising innovative tactics – they were one of the first English teams to use overlapping full-backs. Chelsea set the early pace and emerged in a three-way tussle for the league title with Manchester United and Leeds United. The League Cup was secured thanks to a 3–2 first leg win against Leicester City, with a memorable solo effort from McCreadie proving to be the difference between the sides, and then a hard-fought 0–0 draw in the second leg at Filbert Street.

Cracks were also beginning to appear, however, as the temperamental Docherty increasingly clashed with some of the strong personalities within the dressing room, particularly Venables. The team were beaten by title rivals Manchester United in March and lost 2–0 in their FA Cup semi-final against Liverpool, despite going into the latter match as favourites. They were nonetheless top with four games remaining. Docherty then sent home eight key players (Venables, Graham, Bridges, Hollins, McCreadie, Hinton, Murray and Joe Fascione) for breaking a curfew before a crucial match against Burnley. The bare bones of the team that remained, a collection of reserves and youngsters, were beaten 6–2 as the title challenge collapsed; Chelsea eventually finished third.

The following season proved equally eventful, if ultimately unsuccessful, with Chelsea challenging in the League, the FA Cup and the Fairs Cup. Playing a then-club record total of 60 games in the three competitions in the days before substitutes, the team were hit hard by the fixture pile-up. They finished fifth in the League, while in the FA Cup, Chelsea gained revenge for their semi-final defeat by knocking-out holders Liverpool at Anfield en route to another semi-final, where they were drawn to face Sheffield Wednesday, again at Villa Park. Favourites to reach the final, the side froze on the day and were beaten 2–0 by the Yorkshire club.

Their Fairs Cup run, taking in wins over Roma (a violent encounter, during which the Chelsea team coach was ambushed by Roma fans), 1860 Munich and Milan (the last on the toss of a coin after the teams had finished level), ended in a semi-final loss to Barcelona. Both home sides won 2–0 and on another coin toss, the replay was staged at the Camp Nou, with Barça winning 5–0. Docherty, his relationship with several players having reached breaking point, then made the decision to break up a team with an average age of 21. Venables, Graham, Bridges and Murray were all sold during the close-season. Scottish winger Charlie Cooke joined for £72,000, as did striker Tommy Baldwin, who arrived in part-exchange for Graham. Also emerging from the youth set-up was a highly rated teenage striker named Peter Osgood.

Docherty's transfer manoeuvrings initially paid off. Chelsea, with Osgood at the heart of the team, topped the league table in October 1966, the only unbeaten side after ten league games. But Osgood broke his leg in a League Cup tie and the side's momentum was disrupted. To replace Osgood, Docherty immediately signed striker Tony Hateley for a club record £100,000, but Hateley's aerial game did not suit Chelsea's style and he struggled to fit in. They drifted down the league and finished ninth. The highlight of that season was reaching the FA Cup final. En route to that final was a win over Leeds United in the semi-finals, the game widely seen as the one which kicked off the fierce rivalry between the two clubs. In his finest moment for Chelsea, Hateley headed in what proved to be the winner, but in a hotly contested match, Leeds had two goals disallowed, one for offside and one for a Peter Lorimer free-kick taken too quickly.

Chelsea competed with Tottenham Hotspur in the first all-London FA Cup final, known as the Cockney Cup Final. It was Chelsea's first appearance in the final since 1915 and their first ever appearance in the final at Wembley. In leading out the side, Ron Harris, at 22, was the youngest ever captain to take to the field in the competition's finale. In a game which failed to match the anticipation, Chelsea underperformed and a late Tambling header was not enough to prevent a 2–1 loss to a Spurs side containing both Venables and Jimmy Greaves. Docherty was sacked shortly into the next season with the team having won only two of their opening ten games, which included a 6–2 home loss to Southampton, amidst rumours of dressing room unrest over bonus payments and whilst serving a 28-day ban from football management handed out by the FA.

Dave Sexton
After Docherty's departure, his assistant Ron Suart was placed in temporary charge of the first team. Chelsea lost their next game 7–0 against Leeds United, equalling the club's highest-ever margin of defeat (in 1953–54, they had lost 8–1 to Wolves). Dave Sexton, ex-Chelsea coach and Leyton Orient manager, and a character far more calm and reserved than Docherty, was appointed manager. The core of the side inherited from Docherty remained largely unchanged, although he added more steel to the defence with the signings of John Dempsey and David Webb, as well as signing striker Ian Hutchinson, giving mercurial midfielder Alan Hudson his debut and recalling winger Peter Houseman. Sexton proved a stabilising influence and led Chelsea to two more top-six finishes, as well as a brief foray into the Fairs Cup in 1968–69, where they were knocked out by DWS on a coin toss.

In the 1969–70 season, Osgood and Hutchinson scored 53 goals between them, helping the club finish third in the league and reach another FA Cup final. This time the opponents were Leeds United, reigning league champions and one of the dominant sides of the era. Chelsea were generally second best in the first match at Wembley played on a boggy pitch, but twice came from behind to gain a 2–2 draw, first through Houseman and then a late headed equaliser (four minutes from full-time) from Hutchinson. The replay was staged at Old Trafford a fortnight later and is as well known for the uncompromising tactics employed by both sides as the skill and talent on display. Chelsea again went behind but equalised for the third time in the match with a diving header from Osgood from a Cooke cross. As the game went into extra time, Chelsea took the lead for the first time when Webb headed in a Hutchinson throw-in to seal a 2–1 win.

Winning the Cup qualified Chelsea to play in the UEFA Cup Winners' Cup for the first time. Straightforward wins over Aris and CSKA Sofia took them to the quarter-finals, where they knocked out Club Brugge thanks to a dramatic comeback. Trailing 2–0 after the first leg, it took an Osgood goal nine minutes from the end of normal time in a tense match to put Chelsea level on aggregate. They went on to win the game 4–0 after extra time. Fellow English side (and holders) Manchester City were dispatched in the semi-final. The first final match against Real Madrid finished 1–1 but a rare goal from Dempsey and another strike from Osgood in the replay – played just two days later – were enough to secure a 2–1 win and Chelsea's first European honour. The song "Blue is the Colour" was released in 1972 with members of the squad singing, and it reached number five in the UK Singles Chart. The song was to become one of the most famous English football songs, and forever associated with the Chelsea team of that era.

Decline (1972–83)
The Cup Winners' Cup triumph proved to be the last of Chelsea's successes in the decade, as a series of problems combined to almost bring the club to its knees. From the early 1970s, the discipline of the team began to degenerate, as Sexton fell out with several key players, most notably Osgood, Hudson and Baldwin over their attitude and lifestyle. As the spirit of the team declined, so too did results. Chelsea set two records in defence of the Cup Winners' Cup in 1971–72: a 21–0 aggregate win over Luxembourg side Jeunesse Hautcharage, which remains a record scoreline in European competition. The result included a 13–0 home win over Jeunesse, the biggest winning scoreline in Chelsea's history. However, the team were knocked out of the competition by little-known Åtvidabergs FF under the away goals rule in the next round.

In the same season, Chelsea were knocked out of the FA Cup by Second Division Leyton Orient despite having led 2–0, and lost in the League Cup final to underdogs Stoke City. The 1972–73 season began with a 4–0 win over Leeds and the club were fourth in the table in December, but after a 3–0 aggregate loss to Norwich City in the League Cup semi-finals the season fizzled out and Chelsea won just 5 of their last 21 league games, eventually finishing 12th. They finished 17th the following season. The feud between Sexton and Osgood and Hudson reached its apogee after a 4–2 home defeat to West Ham United on Boxing Day 1973, after Chelsea had led 2–0 at half-time; the pair were both sold a few months later. Sexton himself was sacked early into the 1974–75 season after a poor start, and succeeded by his assistant, Ron Suart, who was unable to reverse the club's decline and they were relegated in 1975.

The building of the pioneering East Stand (which retains its place even in the modern stadium) as part of a plan to create a 60,000 all-seater stadium added to the club's woes. The project coincided with a world economic crisis and was hit by delays, a builders' strike and shortages of materials, all of which sent the cost escalating out of control, to the extent that the club's debts stood at £4 million by 1977. As a result, between August 1974 and June 1978, Chelsea were unable to buy a single player. The decline of the team was matched by a decline in attendances – those who remained were marred by a fierce reputation for violence amongst a section of the Chelsea support (the boundary between passion and hooliganism being dangerously narrow in those days). The late 1970s and the 1980s saw the height of football hooliganism in Britain; while the problem was widespread, Chelsea's hooligan element became particularly notorious and would blight the club throughout the following years.

In the mid-1970s, Chelsea fans were "involved in... many incidents of violence, vandalism and general mayhem". At Luton Town, Chelsea supporters invaded the pitch, smashed shop windows en route back to Luton station, and then set light to their Football Special, resulting in over 100 arrests. During a match against Charlton Athletic at The Valley in 1977, Chelsea fans lit fires on the terraces. In 1976–77, both league matches against Millwall, another club with a notorious hooligan element among their support, were marred by crowd violence. The hooliganism prompted Minister for Sport Denis Howell to ban Chelsea fans from away matches in April 1977 – a similar restriction was also placed on Manchester United fans – although thousands of Chelsea fans defied the ban and travelled to the following match against Wolverhampton Wanderers.

Former left-back Eddie McCreadie became manager shortly before Chelsea's relegation in 1975 and, after a year of consolidation in 1975–76, led the side to promotion again in 1976–77 with a team composed of youth players, most notably Ray Wilkins and 24-goal striker Steve Finnieston, and veterans from more successful times like Cooke, Harris and Bonetti. But McCreadie left following a contract dispute with chairman Brian Mears over a company car and another ex-player was appointed, this time former right-back Ken Shellito.

Shellito kept Chelsea in the First Division in 1977–78, though the highlight of that season was a 4–2 win over European champions Liverpool in the FA Cup. Shellito resigned midway through the following season with the club having won just three league games by Christmas. Even the brief return of Osgood did little to improve the club's fortunes. Shellito's successor, former double-winning Tottenham Hotspur captain Danny Blanchflower was unable to stem the slump and the club were relegated again with just five league wins and 27 defeats, ushering in one of the bleakest periods in Chelsea's history.

Wilkins, one of the club's few remaining stars, was sold to Manchester United and England's 1966 World Cup final hero Geoff Hurst became manager in September 1979 with Bobby Gould as his assistant. Their arrival saw an immediate upturn in Chelsea's form, and for a large period Chelsea topped the Second Division table, but a late collapse saw them finish fourth, meaning the club missed out on promotion on goal difference. In the next season the team struggled to score goals, going on a nine-match run without one, winning only 3 matches in 20 and finishing 12th in 1980–81. Hurst was sacked.

In 1981, Mears resigned as chairman, ending his family's 76-year association with the club. One of Mears' last actions was to appoint former Wrexham boss John Neal as manager. A year later, Chelsea Football & Athletic Company, heavily in debt and unable to pay its players, was acquired from the Mears family interests by businessman and one-time chairman of Oldham Athletic, Ken Bates, for the sum of £1, though for reasons which remain disputed, he did not buy SB Properties, the company which now owned the Stamford Bridge freehold. By this point, Chelsea were in a parlous financial state and losing £12,000 a week. Bates would later describe what he took over as "a social club with a little football played on a Saturday".

1981–82, an otherwise forgettable season during which Chelsea again finished 12th, Chelsea went on their first significant FA Cup run for years and drew European champions Liverpool in the fifth round. They outplayed their illustrious opponents and won 2–0. In the quarter-finals, they were pitted against old rivals Tottenham who, in a pulsating game, won 3–2, despite Chelsea taking the lead through Mike Fillery. The 1982–83 season proved to be the worst in Chelsea's history. Following a bright start, the team slumped dramatically, going on a nine-match winless run as the season drew to a close and faced relegation to the Third Division which, given the club's financial troubles, could well have dealt it a killer blow. A draw at home to Middlesbrough in the final game ensured the club's survival by two points.

Battle for the Bridge
As noted above, when Bates bought Chelsea in 1982, he only bought the club and not SB Properties, the company which now owned the freehold of Stamford Bridge; the club and the stadium had been separated in financial restructuring during the late 1970s. Bates initially agreed a seven-year lease, which would keep Chelsea at Stamford Bridge while its future was decided.

According to Bates, he and David Mears, the majority shareholder of SB Properties, shook hands on a deal which would see Chelsea acquire Mears' stake in SB Properties for £450,000. Bates, however, later discovered that Mears was also in discussions with Crystal Palace owner Ron Noades, with a view to moving Chelsea away from Stamford Bridge and have them ground share with Palace at Selhurst Park. Mears and Lord Chelsea subsequently sold their shares in SB Properties to property developers Marler Estates, giving Marler a 70% stake in the company. This began a long campaign by Marler to force Chelsea out of Stamford Bridge so it could be sold off and redeveloped.

Over the next decade, Bates waged a war of attrition against Marler, acquiring a minority stake in SB Properties and initiating a series of court injunctions and delaying tactics, designed to wear them down. He also launched the "Save the Bridge" campaign, with the aim of raising £15 million to acquire the freehold from Marler. Marler in turn put forward several schemes which would see Chelsea removed from Stamford Bridge. David Bulstrode, chairman of Marler, proposed a merger between Fulham and Queens Park Rangers, with Chelsea then relocating to Rangers' Loftus Road stadium. In March 1986, Marler's plans to redevelop the Stamford Bridge site without Chelsea were approved by Hammersmith and Fulham Council; the council reversed its policy when the Labour Party gained control of it in May 1986. In December 1987, in a "momentous decision", Bates' own plans to redevelop Stamford Bridge into a modern football stadium were approved by the council's planning committee.

Chelsea were nonetheless served notice to quit Stamford Bridge, upon the expiry of the lease in 1989. Cabra Estates, however, which had purchased Marler in 1989, were eventually bankrupted in the property market crash of 1992. This enabled Bates to do a deal with their creditors, the Royal Bank of Scotland, and reunite the freehold with the club. Bates then created the Chelsea Pitch Owners, a non-profit organisation owned by the fans which in 1997 purchased the freehold of the stadium, the club's naming rights and the pitch to ensure that property developers could never again try to purchase Stamford Bridge. Following this, work was begun to renovate the entire stadium (bar the East Stand), making it all-seater and bringing the stands closer to the pitch and under cover, which was finally completed by the millennium.

Notes

References
 
 
 
 
 
 
 
 
 

Chelsea F.C.
Chelsea
Chelsea